Mama Boy  is a 2022 Taiwanese romance drama film directed and co-written by Arvin Chen, and starring Kai Ko, Vivian Hsu, Sara Yu and Fandy Fan. The film had its world premiere on April 25, 2022, at the 24th Far East Film Festival. The film had a theatrical release in Taiwan on August 26, 2022.

Synopsis
The story describes the male protagonist Hsiao Hung, who is nearly 30 years old. Although his appearance is super handsome, Hong is not ready to lose his virginity and lives with his control-freak mother, Meiling. One day, under the introduction of his cousin, he met Lele, a woman who made him fall in love at first sight. A romantic love is here, it unfolds quietly at night in Taipei.

Cast
Kai Ko as Hsiao Hung
Vivian Hsu as Le Le
  Sara Yu
 Fandy Fan
 Joanne Missingham
 Hou Yen-hsi 
 Debbie Yao

References

External links
 
 

2022 drama films
2022 films
2020s Mandarin-language films
Taiwanese romance films